Crim is a surname. Notable people by that name include:

 Bobby Crim, former Democratic politician from Michigan, USA.
 Mort Crim (born 1935), author and former broadcast journalist. 
 Chuck Crim (born 1961), former Major League Baseball relief pitcher.
 Howell G. Crim (1898–1959), American civil servant.
 John Michael Crim, Maltese businessman.

See also
 Cram (surname)
 Crum (surname)